The Lord of the Tax Office (German: Der Herr vom Finanzamt) is a 1929 German silent comedy film directed by Siegfried Philippi.

The film's sets were designed by Gustav A. Knauer.

Cast
In alphabetical order
 Corry Bell as Lilly Lugo  
 Hans Brausewetter as Dr. Stein  
 Johanna Ewald as Alte Schachtel  
 Julius Falkenstein as Udo von Langwitz  
 Paul Heidemann as Dr. Mehlig  
 Trude Lehmann as Rieke  
 Gritta Ley as Trix  
 Leo Peukert as Adolf Schümichen 
 Else Reval as Adolfs Frau  
 Franz Stein as Udo von Langwitzs Vater  
 Leopold von Ledebur as Regierungsrat Wendel 
 Emmy Wyda

References

Bibliography
 Alfred Krautz. International directory of cinematographers, set- and costume designers in film, Volume 4. Saur, 1984.

External links

1929 films
Films of the Weimar Republic
German silent feature films
Films directed by Siegfried Philippi
1929 comedy films
German comedy films
German black-and-white films
Silent comedy films
1920s German films
1920s German-language films